Biernat is a Polish-language surname. Notable people with the surname include:

Agata Biernat (born 1989), Polish beauty pageant titleholder
Andrzej Biernat (born 1960), Polish politician
Edmond Biernat (boirn 1939), French  footballer
Jarosław Biernat (1960–2019), Polish footballer
Len Biernat, American politician
Monica Biernat, American social psychologist
Thaddeus Lewis Biernat (1918-1996), American businessman and politician

Se lso
Biernat of Lublin

[[category:Polish-language surnames]